Alphington Halt railway station was a small station serving the village of Alphington (now a suburb of Exeter) located on the Teign Valley Line, which opened in 1882 and closed in 1961. This diverged from the South Devon Main Line at Exeter and joined the Netwon Abbot to Moretonhampstead line at Heathfield .

History
Alphington Halt had a 100 ft long wooden platform with a flat roofed corrugated shelter located on the eastern side of the single track line with no sidings or passing loop.

Opened by the Great Western Railway in 1928, the station then passed on to the Western Region of British Railways on nationalisation in 1948.

The station was then closed in June 1958 by the British Transport Commission.

The site today 
All that remains in the area of the halt are the stone foundations of the bridge that once carried the line over Church Road, and the railway embankment which can be followed as far as the end of Ide Lane, where the remains of the over bridge can still be seen. The line was destroyed beyond this by the building of the A30 dual carriageway. The trackbed re-emerges west of the site of Ide station a little further down the line.

The site has been developed as residential property, modishly called "the halt at alphington".

Notes

References
 
 
 
 Station on navigable O.S. map

External links
 

Disused railway stations in Devon
Former Great Western Railway stations
Railway stations in Great Britain opened in 1928
Railway stations in Great Britain closed in 1958